Charlton is a town in Victoria, Australia. It is a small agricultural community straddling the Avoca River, located at the junction of the Calder Highway (A79) and Borung Highway (C239) and positioned in the last of the foothills of the Great Dividing Range. Halfway between Melbourne and Mildura, Charlton is a popular tourist stop.

History
The traditional owners of the region are the Jaara people, part of the Djadjawurrung language group of the Kulin nation. They called the area "Youanduk", meaning a basin in a rock, because there were a number of depressions in the local rocks providing a reliable water supply. The names of surrounding agricultural districts reflect the legacy of the First Nations inhabitants: Barrakee, Buckrabanyule, Woosang, Wooroonook and Yeungroon.

After extensive travels throughout the region by Major Thomas Mitchell, settlement by Europeans commenced in 1848 when the squatters Robert Cay and William Kaye established a station and named the region after Charlton near Greenwich, England. Unlike many other towns in the region, Charlton was not established as a result of gold mining, but for pastoral purposes and the proximity to a permanent water supply provided by the Avoca River. The town was originally named East Charlton due to its location on the eastern banks of the Avoca River, and because another Victoria town was already named Charlton (renamed Chute in 1879). The East Charlton Post Office opened on 21 December 1876 (renamed Charlton in 1879) replacing an earlier (1854) office nearby named Yowen Hill.

The first bridge crossing the river was erected in 1867 by James Paterson, allowing expansion on both sides of the river. Throughout the history of Charlton, the Avoca River has been known for its regular flooding after heavy rain. Floods have often surrounded the town or, on rare occasions, flooded the town itself. Levee banks were constructed to their present levels in the 1950s, but parts of the town were flooded in September 2010. Minor flooding occurred again in December 2010, with the highest-ever recorded flood level inundating the town in January 2011, some homes within the town being inundated by water more than 1.6 meters above floor level.

A prominent landmark is the former hotel, the "Vale of Avoca", built in 1879 by James and Elizabeth Egan, on the site of an early bark hut inn. Constructed on a reef of stone, Mrs Egan named the building as being in the "vale" or valley of the nearby Avoca River. Delicensed as a hotel in 1942, the building was restored in the 1990s and currently provides bed and breakfast.

The first issue of the local newspaper, the Tribune, was published on 20 May 1876, the founders being H. T. Henningsen and his step-son, R. M. Klunder.  In 1925, the business was purchased by Messrs Hogan and Gardiner and then followed other proprietors, Herbert Davies and John S. Richardson, and then, after his death in 1954, his widow, Rena M. Richardson. For many years the Tribune was published twice weekly – Wednesdays and Saturdays – but, during World War II, a shortage of staff and paper necessitated the change to weekly publication. In February 1960, Rena Richardson married William Wood and, in 1961, she sold the Tribune to Ian and Coral Cameron. In 1981, the newspaper was sold by the Camerons to the St. Arnaud Mercury, and the Mercury and Tribune were combined to become the North Central News.

Charlton Magistrates' Court closed on 1 January 1983.

Demographics
Charlton is the second largest town in the Shire of Buloke. Government department downsizing in addition to regional economic decline led to the largest percentage decline in population within Victoria between the mid-1980s and the mid-1990s with an estimated 18.3% loss in population. Recent agricultural developments (such as the AWB Limited facilities), a sharp increase in house prices within larger urban areas, in addition to economic recovery, have resulted in a shift towards stabilisation and a subsequent increase in population. However, more than 60% of all local businesses are for sale or remain closed.

Economy
The economic backbone of Charlton is agriculture and services. Several massive grain silos dominate the town skyline, evidence of the town's rich history in various grains including wheat, canola, oats and barley. Sheep and cattle farming are also prolific with the largest beef feedlot in the state, situated in Yeungroon just south of the town. Recent additions to the region, including an olive farm and winery have diversified the town's agricultural applications.

Major employers in the Charlton area are:
 AWB Limited (Grains)
 Boral (Quarry - Mostly for road aggregate)
 Buloke Shire Council (Local Government)
Charlton Feedlot (Livestock)
Charlton P-12 College, Cluster Centre and Saint Joseph's Primary School (Education)
Graincorp (Grains)
Lake Marmal Vineyards (Grapes)
Timbercorp (Olives)

Transport 
Charlton has one public transport connection to Melbourne, a single V/Line coach service serving the town, once a day, five days per week which connects with a train service at Bendigo that goes to Melbourne. Charlton used to have its own railway station on the Kulwin line, although a bare platform remains and no passenger services operate on the line. The line only carries wheat trains.

Climate
Charlton enjoys a Mediterranean style climate, with long hot summers and mild wet winters. Deep blue skies are regular throughout much of the year as are crystal clear starry nights.  Charlton's January average max/min temperatures are 30.4 °C (86.7 °F)/13.8 °C (56.8 °F) and July average max/min temperatures are 13.4 °C (56.1 °F)/3.4 °C (38.1 °F). Annual precipitation is 430.8 mm (16.96") (Source: Bureau of Meteorology ). During the Black Saturday period in 2009, Charlton recorded a temperature of 47.2 C, just short of the state temperature record of 48.8 C.

Facilities

Charlton's central location to the North Central region has resulted in the town being the beneficiary of considerable services not typically associated with such small localities.

The Traveller's Rest is an iconic 'toilet block', held very proudly by the locals, situated in the heart of the town within easy walking of shops and restaurants. Containing picnic facilities, a wishing well, gazebo, views of the river, a footbridge across the river and overnight stop facilities, the Traveller's Rest is a regular stop for tourists, the V/Line bus service and various other tour groups.
Sporting facilities are of a high standard, catering to a diversity of sports participated in by locals and visitors. Australian rules football (Charlton has a team competing in the North Central Football League), hockey, netball, cricket, basketball, bowls and tennis dominate the Charlton sporting calendar. Additionally, the harness racing track is a central feature of the town and region; meets run by the Charlton Harness Racing Club are televised and broadcast on radio nationally.
The Rex Theatre is a fully restored cinema and live theatre serving and operated by the community with various memorabilia and modern movies.
The town exhibits education facilities for residents from kindergarten to the end of high school. There is also a cluster centre that is now part of the P-12 Charlton College, providing additional education services for students and further education for adults.
A comprehensive "driver-training" facility is located within the town, assisting new drivers in learning the rules of the road.
East Wimmera Health Service has a Charlton campus which comprises a nursing home, an ambulance station, a hospital and the "Charlton Medical" doctors surgery.

Recreation and tourism
The river winds through the town with trees and parks lining the banks. Along the river is a 2 km walking track connecting High Street to Charlton Park, where sporting and recreational facilities exist.
The Charlton Golden Grains Museum has information about the town and its history. The museum is open by appointment.
2 km west of town is the Charlton golf course. Built in a clover leaf format, containing three arms of six holes each, the golf course is in the nearby Dooboobetic Hills. Kangaroos and other native flora and fauna are seen on the course.
5 km southeast of the town, views of the region are to be had from Barrakee Hill, or "Quarry Hill" to the locals.
14 km west of the town are the Wooroonook Lakes, providing facilities for water sports enthusiasts, duck shooting, picnickers and campers.
25 km east of the town is Wychetella Forest, containing many native animals, including the rare malleefowl.

Events
Annual Australia Day Tennis Tournament - Held over the Australia Day Long Weekend in January
Art Show - Held every October
Charlton A & P Society Annual Show, held the 3rd weekend in October
Charlton Fishing Competition - Held every November
Charlton Harness Racing Cup - Held every March
Redback Rally - Motorcycle rally, held the second weekend of February
Charlton Film Festival held at the Rex Theatre every February.
Buloke Shire Council official website
Charlton weather

Gallery

References

External links

Towns in Victoria (Australia)
Shire of Buloke